The Jur Mananger (or Mananger) are an ethnic group numbering 20,000 to 30,000 people living in Gogrial District of South Sudan. They speak a Western Nilotic language related to Luo and Shilluk.

References

Ethnic groups in South Sudan